Joel McKay (born 16 July 1979) is a former Australian rules footballer who played with Geelong in the Australian Football League (AFL).

Geelong secured McKay with the 15th selection of the 1997 National Draft. He was drafted from the Murray Bushrangers, but came from Wodonga originally. During his time at Geelong he struggled with back injuries and played just four senior AFL games, two in 1998 and two in 2000.

References

External links
 
 

1979 births
Australian rules footballers from Victoria (Australia)
Geelong Football Club players
Murray Bushrangers players
Living people